Nathan Shawn "Nate" Cash (born March 31, 1976) is an American writer, artist and director. He was born in Utah, and his most well-known works are SpongeBob SquarePants, Adventure Time, and Over the Garden Wall. In addition to that, he has been nominated for a Daytime Emmy Award for "Outstanding Direction in an Animated Program" in 2012.

Career
Cash began his career on The Simpsons as a character layout artist. He started working at Cartoon Network Studios on The Powerpuff Girls and was later a storyboard artist on My Gym Partner's a Monkey. 
He was a writer and storyboard director on the biggest hit from Nickelodeon, SpongeBob SquarePants, from 2006 to 2011. After he left SpongeBob, he became a storyboard supervisor on Adventure Time in Season 2 and later creative director. He left Adventure Time at the end of Season 5 completely to work on the miniseries Over the Garden Wall as a creative director alongside Bert Youn, created by another former creative director of the same show named Patrick McHale. Following his leave from Adventure Time, he was replaced by Andres Salaff.

Filmography

Film

Television

References

External links
 
 http://www.tv.com/people/nate-cash/

Living people
Writers from Utah
American television writers
1976 births
Screenwriters from Utah